November is the eleventh and penultimate month of the year in the Julian and Gregorian Calendars, the fourth and last of four months to have a length of 30 days and the fifth and last of five months to have a length of fewer than 31 days. November was the ninth month of the calendar of Romulus . November retained its name (from the Latin novem meaning "nine") when January and February were added to the Roman calendar.
November is a month of late spring in the Southern Hemisphere and late autumn in the Northern Hemisphere. Therefore, November in the Southern Hemisphere is the seasonal equivalent of May in the Northern Hemisphere and vice versa. In Ancient Rome, Ludi Plebeii was held from November 4–17, Epulum Jovis was held on November 13 and Brumalia celebrations began on November 24. These dates do not correspond to the modern Gregorian calendar.

November was referred to as Blōtmōnaþ by the Anglo-Saxons. Brumaire and Frimaire were the months on which November fell in the French Republican calendar.

Astronomy 
November meteor showers include the Andromedids, which occurs from September 25 to December 6 and generally peak around November 9–14, the Leonids, which occurs from November 15–20, the Alpha Monocerotids, which occurs from November 15–25 with the peak on November 21–22, the Northern Taurids, which occurs from October 20 to December 10, and the Southern Taurids, which occurs from September 10 – November 20, and the Phoenicids; which occur from November 29 to December 9 with the peak occurring on December 5–6. The Orionids, which occurs in late October, sometimes lasts into November.

Astrology 
The Western zodiac signs for November are Scorpio (October 23 – November 21) and Sagittarius (November 22 – December 21).

November symbols 

November's birthstone is the topaz (particularly, yellow) which symbolizes friendship and the citrine.
Its birth flower is the chrysanthemum.

November observances 
This list does not necessarily imply either official status or general observance.

Non-Gregorian observances: 2020 dates 
(All Baha'i, Islamic, and Jewish observances begin at the sundown prior to the date listed, and end at sundown of the date in question unless otherwise noted.)
List of observances set by the Bahá'í calendar
List of observances set by the Chinese calendar
List of observances set by the Hebrew calendar
List of observances set by the Islamic calendar
List of observances set by the Solar Hijri calendar

Month-long observances 
In Catholic tradition, November is the Month of the Holy Souls in Purgatory.
Academic Writing Month
Annual Family Reunion Planning Month
Lung Cancer Awareness Month
Movember
National Novel Writing Month 
No Nut November
Pancreatic Cancer Awareness Month (United Kingdom)
Pulmonary Hypertension Awareness Month
Stomach Cancer Awareness Month

United States 
Native American Heritage Month
COPD Awareness Month
Epilepsy Awareness Month
Military Family Month
National Adoption Month
National Alzheimer's Disease Awareness Month
National Blog Posting Month 
National Critical Infrastructure Protection Month
National Entrepreneurship Month 
National Family Caregivers Month 
National Bone Marrow Donor Awareness Month
National Diabetes Month
National Homeless Youth Month
National Hospice Month
National Impaired Driving Prevention Month
National Pomegranate Month
Prematurity Awareness Month

Movable observances, 2021 dates 
Mitzvah Day International: November 15
See also Movable Western Christian observances
See also Movable Eastern Christian observances

First Sunday: November 7
Daylight saving time ends (United States and Canada)

First Monday: November 1
Recreation Day holiday (Northern Tasmania)

Tuesday after the first Monday: November 2
Election Day (United States)

First Wednesday: November 3
National Eating Healthy Day (United States)

First Thursday: November 4
International Stout Day
Thanksgiving (Liberia) 
National Men Make Dinner Day (United States)

First Friday: November 5
Arbor Day (Samoa)

First Saturday: November 6
Children's Day (South Africa)
Health Day (Turkmenistan)
National Bison Day (United States)

Second Sunday: November 14
Father's Day (Estonia, Finland, Iceland, Norway, and Sweden)
Grandparents Day (South Sudan)
National Day of the Pupusa (El Salvador)
Remembrance Sunday (United Kingdom, Commonwealth)

Week of November 8: November 7–13
National Radiologic Technology Week (United States)

Week of November 11: November 7–13
Celebrate Freedom Week (Oklahoma, United States)

Second Monday: November 8
Barack Obama Day (Perry County, Alabama, United States)
Heir to the Throne's Birthday (Tuvalu)

'Second Saturday: November 13
National Tree Planting Day (Luxembourg)

Third Sunday: November 21
World Day of Remembrance for Road Traffic Victims (United Nations observance)

Third week: November 14–20
Geography Awareness Week

Third Monday: November 15
Revolution Day (Mexico)

Weekdays of the third week: November 15–19
Anti-Bullying Week (United Kingdom)

Wednesday of the third week: November 17
GIS Day

Third Thursday: November 18
Great American Smokeout (United States)
World Philosophy Day (United Nations)

Third Friday: November 19
International Stand Up to Bullying Day

Third Friday until the next Monday: November 19–22
El Buen Fin (Mexico)

Saturday before Fourth Thursday: November 20
National Adoption Day (United States)
National Survivors of Suicide Day (United States)

Last Week: November 21–27
AIDS Awareness Week (Canada)

Day before fourth Thursday: November 25
Blackout Wednesday (United States)

Last Wednesday: November 24
Thanksgiving (Norfolk Island, Australia)

Fourth Thursday: November 25
Thanksgiving (United States)

Day after fourth Thursday: November 26
Black Friday (United States)
Buy Nothing Day (United States)
Fur Free Friday (International observance)
National Day of Listening (United States)
Native American Heritage Day (United States)
Sinkie Day (United States)

Fourth Saturday: November 27
Holodomor Memorial Day (Canada, Ukraine)

Saturday after Thanksgiving: November 27
Small Business Saturday (United States)

Fourth Sunday: November 28
National Grandparents Day (Singapore)
 
Last Sunday: November 28
Harvest Festival (Turkmenistan)

Monday after fourth Thursday in November: November 29
Cyber Monday

Fixed observances 

November 1
All Saints' Day (Catholicism)
Day of the Dead, first day: Day of the Innocents (Haiti, Mexico)
Andhra Pradesh Formation Day (Andhra Pradesh, India)
Anniversary of the Revolution (Algeria)
Calan Gaeaf, celebrations start at sunset of October 31. (Wales)
Chavang Kut (Mizo people of Northeast India, Bangladesh, Burma)
Coronation of the fifth Druk Gyalpo (Bhutan)
Haryana Foundation Day (Haryana, India)
Independence Day (Antigua and Barbuda)
International Lennox-Gastaut Syndrome Awareness Day
Karnataka Foundation Day (Karnataka, India) 
Kerala Foundation Day (Kerala, India)
Liberty Day (United States Virgin Islands) 
National Awakening Day (Bulgaria) 
Samhain in the Northern Hemisphere and Beltane in the Southern Hemisphere, celebrations start at sunset of October 31 (Neopagan Wheel of the Year) 
Self-Defense Forces Commemoration Day (Japan) 
World Vegan Day 
November 2
All Souls' Day (Roman Catholic Church and Anglican Communion)
Coronation of Haile Selassie (Rastafari)
Day of the Dead, second day (Mexico)
Dziady (Belarus)
Indian Arrival Day (Mauritius)
International Day to End Impunity for Crimes Against Journalists (United Nations)
Statehood Day (North Dakota and South Dakota, United States)
November 3
Culture Day (Japan)
Independence Day (Dominica)
Independence Day (Micronesia) 
Independence Day (Panama)
Independence Day of Cuenca (Ecuador) 
Victory Day (Maldives)
November 4
Community Service Day (Dominica)
Flag Day (Panama)
National Tonga Day (Tonga)
National Unity and Armed Forces Day (Italy)
Unity Day (Russia)
Yitzhak Rabin Memorial (Israel, unofficial, but widely commemorated)
November 5
Bank Transfer Day (United States)
Colón Day (Panama) 
Guy Fawkes Night (United Kingdom, New Zealand and Newfoundland and Labrador, Canada), and its related observances:
West Country Carnival (English West Country)
Kanakadasa Jayanthi (Karnataka, India)
National Love Your Red Hair Day (Ireland)
November 6
Arbor Day (Republic of Congo)
Constitution Day (Dominican Republic)
Finnish Swedish Heritage Day (Finland)
Green March (Morocco)
Gustavus Adolphus Day (Sweden)
International Day for Preventing the Exploitation of the Environment in War and Armed Conflict
Malaria Day in the Americas
November 7
Commemoration Day (Tunisia)
Hungarian Opera Day (Hungary)
National Day (Northern Catalonia, France)
October Revolution Day (Belarus, Transnistria)
Tokhu Emong (Lotha Naga people of India)
Birthday of Radman, the King of Serbia
November 8
Intersex Day of Remembrance 
Statehood Day, Montana, United States
November 9
Independence Day (Cambodia)
November 10 
National Heroes Day (Indonesia)
Commemoration of Mustafa Kemal Atatürk (Turkey)
World Keratoconus Day
November 11
Independence Day (Angola, Poland)
Veterans Day (United States)
Remembrance Day (Canada)
Statehood day of Washington State, United States
November 12
Birthday of Sun Yat-Sen, also Doctors' Day and Cultural Renaissance Day (Taiwan)
Constitution Day (Azerbaijan)
Father's Day (Indonesia)
National Health Day (Indonesia)
National Youth Day (East Timor)
World Pneumonia Day
November 13
Sadie Hawkins Day (United States) 
World Kindness Day
November 14
Children's Day (India)
World Diabetes Day
November 15
National Peace Day (Ivory Coast)
Independence Day (Palestine)
November 16
Statehood Day Oklahoma, United States
November 17
World Prematurity Day
November 18
Day of Army and Victory (Haiti)
Proclamation Day of the Republic of Latvia (Latvia) 
Independence Day (Morocco)
Married To A Scorpio Support Day (Chase's Calendar of Events)
National Apple Cider Day (United States)
National Day (Oman)
National Vichyssoise Day (United States)
Remembrance Day of the Sacrifice of Vukovar in 1991 (Croatia)
Feast day of Saint Constant
November 19
Carbonated Beverage with Caffeine Day (United States)
Day of Discovery of Puerto Rico (Puerto Rico)
Day of Missile Forces and Artillery (Russia, Belarus)
Flag Day (Brazil)
Garifuna Settlement Day (Belize)
Have a Bad Day Day (Chase's Calendar of Events)
International Men's Day
Monaco National Day (Monaco)
Women's Entrepreneurship Day
World Toilet Day
November 20
20-N (Spain)
Africa Industrialization Day (international)
Black Awareness Day (Brazil)
Children's Day
Day of National Sovereignty (Argentina)
Día de la Revolución (Mexico)
Revolution Day (Mexico)
Royal Thai Navy Day (Thailand)
Teachers' Day or Ngày nhà giáo Việt Nam (Vietnam)
Transgender Day of Remembrance 
November 21
Statehood Day North Carolina, United States
November 22
Independence Day (Lebanon) 
November 23
Labor Thanksgiving Day (Japan)
Repudiation Day (Frederick County, Maryland, United States)
Rudolf Maister Day (Slovenia)
St George's Day (Georgia)
November 24 
Evolution Day (International observance)
Lachit Divas (Assam, India)
Martyrdom of Guru Tegh Bahadur (India)
Teachers' Day (Turkey)
November 25
Blasé Day
Evacuation Day (New York) (United States)
National Parfait Day (United States)
Independence Day (Suriname)
International Day for the Elimination of Violence against Women 
National Day (Bosnia and Herzegovina)
St Catherine's Day
Teachers' Day or Hari Guru (Indonesia)
Vajiravudh Day (Thailand)
November 26
Ace Visibility Day
Constitution Day (Abkhazia, Georgia)
Constitution Day (India)
National Cake Day (United States)
Republic Day (Mongolia)
November 27
Our Lady of the Miraculous Medal (Roman Catholic)
Maaveerar Day (Tamil Eelam)
National Bavarian Cream Pie Day (United States)
Teacher's Day (Spain)
November 28
Independence Day (Albania)
Independence Day (Mauritania)
Proclamation of Independence Day (East Timor)
November 29
November 30
Bonifacio Day (Philippines)
St Andrews Day (official national holiday in Scotland)

References 

 
11